Perth Academy is a non-denominational state school in Perth, Scotland.

Alumni

References 

Perth Academy
Perth Academy
Perth Academy